Zarrin Gol (also Romanized as Zarrīn Gol and Zarīngul) is a village in Zarrin Gol Rural District, in the Central District of Aliabad County, Golestan Province, Iran. At the 2006 census, its population was 625, in 156 families.

References 

Populated places in Aliabad County